Vulcaniella karadaghella is a moth of the family Cosmopterigidae. It is found in Asia Minor and on the Crimea.

The wingspan is 10–12 mm. Adults are on wing from late June to early July.

The larvae feed on Salvia grandiflora. They mine the leaves of their host plant. They create a mine in the tip of a leaf. Soon the apical part of the leaf turns brown and dries, forming a characteristic rosette. Pupation takes place within this rosette.

External links
bladmineerders.nl
Fauna Europaea

Vulcaniella
Moths described in 1986